Dionysis Makrydimitris (born 26 January 1985) is a Greek professional footballer who plays as a defender or a defensive midfielder for Super League 2 club Rodos, for which he is captain.

Career
Born in Rhodes, Makrydimitris began playing football with local side Rodos F.C. in the Delta Ethniki. He helped the club to gain promotion to the Gamma Ethniki, before signing with Kerkyra in 2008. Since the summer of 2011, he plays for Panthrakikos.

References

External links
Profile at EPAE.org
Profile at Guardian Football
Profile at Onsports.gr

1985 births
Living people
Greek footballers
Rodos F.C. players
A.O. Kerkyra players
Panthrakikos F.C. players
Olympiacos Volos F.C. players
Agrotikos Asteras F.C. players
Panachaiki F.C. players
Association football defenders
Association football midfielders
People from Rhodes
Sportspeople from the South Aegean